This is a list of federally recognized major generals of the National Guard of the United States as of March 2023.

Federal assignments

Department of Defense

Office of the Secretary of Defense

Defense Agencies

Joint Staff

Unified Combatant Commands

National Guard Bureau

Other joint positions

Department of the Army

United States Army

Department of the Air Force

United States Air Force

United States Space Force

State assignments

State adjutants general

Pacific Region

Mountain states

East North Central Region

West North Central Region

New England

Mid-Atlantic Region

South Atlantic Region

East South Central states

West South Central states

Non-state territories

Units and formations

Pending appointments

United States Army

United States Air Force

See also
List of United States military leaders by rank
List of United States Army four-star generals
List of United States Marine Corps four-star generals
List of United States Navy four-star admirals
List of United States Air Force four-star generals
List of United States Space Force four-star generals
List of United States Coast Guard four-star admirals
List of United States Public Health Service Commissioned Corps four-star admirals
List of active duty United States three-star officers
List of active duty United States Army major generals
List of active duty United States Marine Corps major generals
List of active duty United States rear admirals
List of active duty United States Air Force major generals
List of active duty United States Space Force general officers
List of active duty United States senior enlisted leaders and advisors

References

Notes

+
National Guard
Major Generals
United States National Guard two-star generals